Gulzar Uddin Ahmed, also known as Colonel Gulzar Ahmed, was the founding director of the intelligence wing and also served Additional Director General of Rapid Action Battalion. Until his death, he was a Colonel of the Bangladesh Army and also Sector Commander and Deputy Director General of Bangladesh Rifles.

Career

On 26 March 2004, when Rapid Action Battalion or RAB was founded, Ahmed was deputed from Bangladesh Army to the role of commanding officer of RAB-3 division. Mominullah David, Jubo Dal leader and accused in 31 criminal cases, was killed in a shootout with RAB officers under Ahmed's command in Malibagh in November 2004. Founder of Purbo Banglar Communist Party Mofakkhar Hossain, also known as Mahamud Hasan, shootout with RAB officers from RAB-3 in December 2004.

In 2005, the first intelligence wing of Rapid Action Battalion was formed and Ahmed was appointed to work as the chief intelligence wing of Rapid Action Battalion. He and Abdul Aziz Sarkar went to Taskforce for Interrogation Cell to interrogate Mufti Hannan over the 21 August 2004 Dhaka grenade attack in presence of Criminal Investigation Department officer Munshi Atiqur Rahman.

Ahmed was notable for anti-terrorism activity against religious extremism in Bangladesh. He was the mastermind of the operation in March 2006 which led to arrest of hundreds of Jamaat-ul-Mujahideen members, a Bangladeshi terrorist group, and 6 top leaders including Shaykh Abdur Rahman and Bangla Bhai. He led the operation to arrest Shaykh Abdur Rahman in Sylhet on 2 March 2006. He led the operation to arrest Bangla Bhai in Mymensingh on 2 March 2006. He led the raid that killed Shakil alias Mollah Omar, bomb expert of Jamaat-ul-Mujahideen Bangladesh, in Comilla on 14 March 2006. His team also successfully captured large stock of explosives, nitric acid and grenades belonging to Jamaat-ul-Mujahideen in November 2008. His work against terrorism made him a "National Hero".

In 2006, Ahmed was promoted to Colonel and was transferred to Bangladesh Rifles (BDR) currently known as Border Guards Bangladesh. Later, he was transferred to Rapid Action Battalion as additional director general. He reported the arrest of AKM Fazlul Haque Milon, former member of parliament from Bangladesh Nationalist Party, by RAB on corruption charges on 5 September 2007. He oversaw training of RAB in human rights from the British High Commission to Bangladesh.

In January 2009, Prime Minister Sheikh Hasina appointed him as the Sylhet Sector commander of Bangladesh Rifles (renamed as Border Guards Bangladesh).

Death

Ahmed was assassinated in the Bangladesh Rifles mutiny while attending the annual gathering of all sector commanders of Bangladesh Rifles on 26 February 2009. He had called for help but did not get any response during the mutiny. Beside Gulzar Ahmed, all other commanders who were present at the gathering were also assassinated. His body was found ten days after the mutiny with visible signs of torture. It had to be identified using DNA test. He was buried in Banani Army Graveyard. It was speculated that he was killed in revenge by terrorists.

Personal life 
Ahmed married Fatema Sultana. They had two daughters.

See also
Md Shawkat Imam-Fellow commander killed in the Mutiny

References

2009 deaths
Rapid Action Battalion officers
Bangladesh Army colonels
1964 births